This article show all participating men's team squads at the 2007 Pan American Games, played by eight countries held in Rio de Janeiro, Brazil.

Head coach: Jon Uriarte

Head coach: Bernardo Rezende

Head coach: Glenn Hoag

Head coach: Orlando Samuel

Head coach: Jorge Azair

Head coach: Luis Ruiz

Head coach: Hugh McCutcheon

Head coach: Ricardo Navajas

See also
Volleyball at the 2007 Pan American Games – Women's team rosters

References
NORCECA

Volleyball at the 2007 Pan American Games